Axie Infinity is a non-fungible token-based online video game developed by Vietnamese studio Sky Mavis, known for its in-game economy which uses Ethereum-based cryptocurrencies. It has been called 'a pyramid scheme that relies on cheap labor from countries like the Philippines to fuel its growth.'

Players of Axie Infinity collect and mint NFTs which represent axolotl-inspired digital pets known as Axies. These creatures can be bred and battled with each other within the game. Sky Mavis charges a 4.25% fee to players when they trade Axies on its marketplace.

In September 2021, most Axie Infinity players were from the Philippines.

Axie Infinity is built on the Ronin Network, an Ethereum-linked sidechain developed by Sky Mavis. The game's official Cryptocurrency is "Axie Infinity Shards/Token" or AXS for short. The game's secondary  token, SLP, crashed in February 2022 amid a wider NFT and cryptocurrency crash, losing over 99% of its peak value. In March 2022, hackers compromised the Ronin Network, stealing approximately US$620 million worth of cryptocurrency from the project. The hackers were linked to Lazarus Group, funded by North Korea.

Gameplay 
According to the company's website, Axie Infinity is a competitive game with an "idle battle" system derived from games like Final Fantasy Tactics and Idle Heroes. The game's setting is filled with creatures called Axies that players can collect as pets. Players aim to battle, breed, collect, raise, and build kingdoms for their Axies. The game has an in-game economy where players can buy, sell, and trade resources they earn in the game.

Sky Mavis marketed the game with a "play-to-earn" model (also called "pay-to-play-to-earn" model) where after participants pay the starting costs, they can earn an Ethereum-based in-game cryptocurrency by playing. Axie Infinity allows users to cash-out their tokens every fourteen days. This model has been described as a form of gambling, and one with an unstable market that is overly reliant on the inflow of new players.

In February 2020, Sky Mavis estimated that a new player would need to spend around US$400 to meet this starting requirement. By August 2020, the cheapest Axie cost approximately US$307, although reports as of March 2022 suggest the floor price of an Axie has dipped to around US$20.

In the Philippines, the prohibitive cost of entry led to both individuals and gaming guilds renting out assets to allow new players meet the minimum requirements. These new players, known as "scholars", are often required to meet a quota of in-game earning to continue using the rented assets, and must pay the owners a commission. These commissions vary greatly but can be as high as 75%.

As of June 2021, some people in the Philippines had begun to treat the game as their main source of income, although earning rates from playing Axie Infinity fell below the national minimum wage by September 2021. The Philippine Department of Finance also clarified that income from playing Axie Infinity is taxable, and suggested that the SEC and BSP may classify its cryptocurrency as a currency or a security.

Players of Axie Infinity can also purchase virtual land and other in-game assets as NFTs. The record sale of a plot of virtual land was priced at US$2.3 million, as of 25 November 2021. Gameplay related to purchased virtual land was intended to be introduced by 2020, but this has been pushed back twice as of April 2022. The delays have prompted complaints from users coinciding with a sharp decline in the profitability of the in-game economy.

Development and history 
Development of Axie Infinity commenced in 2017, led by its co-founder and CEO, Nguyen Thanh Trung, alongside Tu Doan, Aleksander Larsen, Jeffrey Zirlin, and Andy Ho. Nguyen had previously spent money on the game CryptoKitties before he began work on his own blockchain-based game, combining elements of CryptoKitties with gameplay from the Pokémon series or Neopets.

In October 2018, the development team released Axie Infinity's first battle system. Development of the real-time card battle system and application commenced in March 2019, and an alpha was released in December 2019.

Sky Mavis launched Ronin wallet in February 2021, which in addition to speeding up transactions and eliminating expensive gas fees for gamers offers the opportunity to play Axie Infinity or any other dApp that run on the Ronin sidechain.

The value of the game's associated token, Smooth Love Potion (SLP) (formerly known as Small Love Potion by the community), crashed in February 2022 amid a wider NFT and cryptocurrency crash, losing over 99% of its peak value. Sky Mavis attempted to stabilize the price by introducing new features to the game, but these attempts were ineffective. The low exchange value of SLP has caused a massive exodus of players, leaving guild leaders without their cheap third-world labor force to grind on their behalf. Sky Mavis removed references to "play-to-earn" on its websites and marketing as its tokens plummeted in value.

On 23 March 2022, hackers compromised the Ronin Network, stealing approximately US$620 million in Ether and USDC. A total of 173,600 Ether and 25.5 million USDC tokens were stolen in two transactions.  It took the company six days to notice the hack. The hack currently sits as the largest-ever breach in the cryptocurrency sector by dollar value. It further damaged the value of SLP.
On 8 April 2022, Sky Mavis said it expected it would be able to recover some of the funds, but it would take several years. The company raised additional venture capital and reimbursed all users affected in the hack. On 14 April 2022, the FBI issued a statement that the Lazarus Group and APT38, which are North Korean state-sponsored hacker groups, were responsible for the theft. Accordingly, the US Treasury has sanctioned the cryptocurrency address. Some of the cryptocurrency has been laundered through a cryptocurrency tumbler known as "Tornado Cash".

See also
Blockchain
Blockchain game
Decentralized application
Non-fungible token

References

Further reading

Blockchain games
Ethereum
Video games developed in Vietnam
Virtual pet video games
Cryptocurrency theft